Cyanothamnus coerulescens, commonly known as blue boronia, is a plant in the citrus family, Rutaceae and is endemic to southern Australia. It is a small, spindly shrub with glandular stems, small, more or less cylindrical leaves and blue to pinkish mauve, four-petalled flowers. There are two subspecies endemic to Western Australia and a third that also occurs in three eastern states.

Description
The flowers are bright blue, lilac-coloured or white and are arranged singly in leaf axils or in dense, leafy spikes on the end of the branches. The eight stamens and the style are slightly hairy.

Taxonomy and naming
Blue boronia was first formally described in 1854 by Ferdinand von Mueller and the description was published in Transactions of the Philosophical Society of Victoria. In a 2013 paper in the journal Taxon, Marco Duretto and others changed the name to Cyanothamnus bussellianus on the basis of cladistic analysis. The specific epithet (coerulescens) is a Latin word caeruleus meaning "sky blue" with the ending - signifying "beginning of" or "becoming".

In 2019, Paul Graham Wilson described three subspecies in the journal Nuytsia. The names have subsequently been changed to reflect the change in the genus name:
 Cyanothamnus coerulescens F.Muell. subsp. coerulescens (the autonym) has flowers in leaf axils;
 Cyanothamnus coerulescens subsp. spicatus (Paul G.Wilson) Duretto & Heslewood that has flowers in dense, leafy, spike-like racemes;
 Cyanothamnus coerulescens subsp. spinescens (Benth.) Duretto & Heslewood, originally described in 1863 as Boronia spinescens by George Bentham, is a variable subspecies with spreading, often pungent branchlets and is similar to subspecies coerulescens.

Distribution and habitat
Blue boronia grows in mallee woodland. Subspecies coerulescens occurs in the south-west of Western Australia, in South Australia, Victoria and in the far south-west of New South Wales. Subspecies spicata occurs in Western Australia between Wubin and Muntadgin and spinescens is found in similar areas to subspecies coerulescens but only in Western Australia.

Conservation
All three subspecies of C. coerulescens are classified as "not threatened" by the Western Australian Government Department of Parks and Wildlife.

References

coerulescens
Flora of New South Wales
Flora of South Australia
Flora of Victoria (Australia)
Flora of Western Australia
Plants described in 1854
Taxa named by Ferdinand von Mueller